Paint Rock is an unincorporated community in Madison County, North Carolina, United States. The community is named after the nearby mountain of the same name along the North Carolina–Tennessee state line.  Located along the south banks of the French Broad River, the community is accessible via Paint Rock Road (SR 1300), which connects to US 25/US 70.  The Norfolk Southern S-Line also travels through the community.  The community is part of the Asheville Metropolitan Statistical Area.

References

Unincorporated communities in Madison County, North Carolina
Unincorporated communities in North Carolina